Koźle is a district of Kędzierzyn-Koźle (since 1975), Poland and is at the junction of the Kłodnica and Oder rivers,  km southeast of Opole. The district has a Roman Catholic church, a medieval chateau, remains of a 19th-century fortress and a high school. Koźle's industries include a shipyard and an inland port.

History 

The settlement was first mentioned in the early 12th-century Gesta principum Polonorum, the oldest Polish chronicle. Its name comes from the Polish word kozioł, which means "goat". As a result of the fragmentation of Poland, from 1281 to 1355 Koźle was the seat of a splinter eponymous duchy ruled by a local branch of the Piast dynasty. Also in 1281, Koźle obtained town rights. After 1355, it remained under the rule of other branches of the Polish Piast dynasty until 1532, when it was absorbed to Bohemia. It was besieged several times during the Thirty Years War, and in 1645, it returned to Polish rule under the House of Vasa.

It fell to Prussia by the 1742 Treaty of Breslau. Frederick II converted it into a fortress which held against Austrian sieges in 1758, 1759, 1760 and 1762. In 1807 it almost withstood a siege by the Von Deroy brigade of the Bavarian Army, which was allied with Napoleonic France. From 1871 it was part of the German Empire. Polish insurgents captured the part of the town east of the Oder during the 1921 Third Silesian Uprising, however, the town remained part of Germany in the interbellum. Local Polish activists were intensively persecuted by the Germans since 1937. During World War II, the Germans operated three forced labour subcamps (E2, E153, E155) of the Stalag VIII-B/344 prisoner-of-war camp in the town. In the final stages of the war, in 1945, a German-conducted death march of thousands of prisoners of several subcamps of the Auschwitz concentration camp passed through the town towards the Gross-Rosen concentration camp. With the bulk of Silesia, it was among territories regained by Poland after World War II.

Notable residents 
 Theodor von Scheve (1851–1922), chess master
 Georg Kaul (1873–1933), politician
 Erna von Dobschütz (1876–1963), painter
 Georg Rasel (1882–1945), German artist
 Kurt Liese (1882–1945), German general
 Moritz Hadda (1887–1942), Jewish-German architect
 Heinrich Tischler (1892–1938), German painter
 Irene Eisinger (1903–1994), singer
 Georg Wahl (1920–2013), equestrian
 Hanno von Graevenitz (1937–2007), German diplomat
 Ullrich Libor (1940–), German sportsman
 Mathias Fischer (1971–), sportsman

References

Kędzierzyn-Koźle
Neighbourhoods in Poland